Lamine Wade (born 31 July 1943) is a Senegalese judoka. He competed in the men's half-middleweight event at the 1976 Summer Olympics.

References

1943 births
Living people
Senegalese male judoka
Olympic judoka of Senegal
Judoka at the 1976 Summer Olympics
Place of birth missing (living people)
African Games medalists in judo
Competitors at the 1973 All-Africa Games
Competitors at the 1978 All-Africa Games
African Games bronze medalists for Senegal